Le Quy Don Technical University, also known as Military Technical Academy (Học viện Kỹ thuật Quân sự), was founded in 1966 and is one of the national key universities in Vietnam. Le Quy Don Technical University has developed into an open, multidisciplinary, research-oriented, leading national university.

History
 On August 8, 1966, the 146/CP decision of the Vietnamese government marked the establishment of the university as the Second Branch of the Polytechnic. It opened on October 28, 1966, and the first course of training officially commenced at the Second Branch by the representatives of the Ministry of Education and Training and the Ministry of National Defense;
 May 6, 1991 marked the 150/CT Decision of the Vietnamese government for the establishment of the Le Quy Don Technical University (LeTech);
 In 2007 there were 10000 undergraduate and graduate students. The faculty consisted of about 800 professors and lecturers, among them 237 holding Doctor of Science and Ph.D degrees;
 January 31, 2008: The university was recognized as a National Key University in Vietnam;
 Today (2016, over 20,000 undergraduates and over 2,000 graduates are learning at LeTech.

Role and mission

Role
 Providing a continuing source of workforce with highly qualified specialists and engineers in the field of science and technology for industrialization and modernization of the country.
 Being one of the national key universities in Vietnam, one of the national top universities of science and technology.

Mission
 Providing civilian engineers, Masters of Science and Doctors of Philosophy
 Providing military engineers, Masters of Science, Doctors of Philosophy and technical staff officers
 Conducting scientific research and transferring technology 
 Educating foreign students

Academics
The degree programs include:
 Bachelor's degree: 45 programs 
 Master's degree: 27 programs
 Doctoral degree: 20 programs

Undergraduate programs
 Chemical Engineering
 Environmental Engineering
 Prevention of NBC
 Explosive Material Technology
 Information Technology
 Computer Science
 Information Systems
 Software Engineering
 Networking
 Machine Engineering
 Forging Technology
 Material Technology
 Automotive Engineering
 Construction Machine Engineering
 Mechatronics
 Electronics
 Communications
 Radar and Navigation
 Automation and Computing Technique,
 Electrical Engineering
 Aerospace Control Systems
 Biomedical Engineering
 Defensive Engineering
 Airfield Engineering
 Road and Bridge Engineering
 Civil Engineering
 Geomatics
 Electronic Technologies
 Electronic Design and System Integration 
 Integrated Microcircuit Design specializing in Radar, Information

Main schools and faculties
 School of Physics and Chemical Engineering
 School of Information Technology and Communication
 School of  Mechanical Engineering
 School of  Special Machine Engineering 
 School of  Vehicle Engineering
 School of  Aerospace Technology
 School of  Radio and Electronics Engineering
 School of  Automation and Control Engineering
 School of  Civil Engineering
 Faculty of Economics and Technical Management
 Faculty of Social and Human Sciences
 Faculty of Defence Education
 Faculty of Foreign Language

Main institutes and research centers
 Institute of Simulation Technology
 Institute of Techniques for Special Engineering
 Institute of System Integration
 Advanced Technology Center
 Center for Chemico-Physical Engineering
 Center for Computing
 Center for Mechanical Propulsion
 Center for Model Airplanes
 Center for Mechatronic Design
 Center for Electronics and Telecommunications Engineering
 Center for Construction Consultancy
 Center for Applied Research and Quality Assessment of Construction Products
 Center for System Designing
 Center for Microcircuit Designing.

Main campuses
 Campus 1: 236 Hoang Quoc Viet Street, Bac Tu Liem District, Hanoi, Vietnam.
 Campus 2: Me Linh Street, Vinh Yen City, Vinh Phuc Province, Vietnam.
 Campus 3: 71 Cong Hoa Street, Tan Binh District, Ho Chi Minh City, Vietnam.
 Campus 4: Phuong Canh, Nam Tu Liem District, Hanoi, Vietnam
 Campus 5: Hoa Lac Hi-tech Park, Hanoi, Vietnam

International cooperation and main partner
With the aim of becoming a research university, improving the quality in education and research, LQDTU pays high attention to development of international cooperation.
International cooperation activities: Within the framework of international cooperation the university carries out the following activities:
 Exchange of students and teaching staff
 Exchange of information and experience
 Development of joint academic and research program
 Internship
 Participation in scientific conferences, workshops, symposia
 Conducting joint research projects
Le Quy Don Technical University has set up cooperation in training and research with over 100 universities, research institutes and companies from nearly 30 countries in the world. The following are parts of this network:
 Japan:  National Defense Academy of Japan, Osaka University, Japan Advanced Institute of Science and Technology, The University of Electro-Communications, JAIST, IHI AEROSPACE Co., Ltd.,  Institute of Space and Astronautical Science (ISAS), Tsukuba Space Center (JAXA)
 Republic of Korea: Changjing Company, Shinjeong Company, Kyung Hee University,  Korea University.
 China: Tsinghua University, University of Science and Technology Beijing, Xidian University, Xi’an Jiaotong University, Nanjing University of Science and Technology, Harbin Institute of Technology,... 
 Singapore: Nanyang Technological University, ST Electronic, Christie.
 Thailand: Asian Institute of Technology (AIT).
 Russia: Bauman Moscow State Technical University, Moscow Aviation Institute (National Research University), Peter the Great St. Petersburg Polytechnic University, Moscow State University of Civil Engineering, Moscow Automobile and Road Construction University “MADI”, Moscow State Mining University, Saint Petersburg State Electrotechnical University “LETI”, Moscow Institute of Physics and Technology “MIPT”, Saint Petersburg National Research University of Information Technologies, Mechanics and Optics (ITMO University),  Orenburg State Institute of Management, Moscow State Institute of Radio Engineering, Electronics and Automation - MIREA, Tomsk State University, Kazan National Research Technical University named after A.N.Tupolev - KAI (KNRTU-KAI).
 Ukraine: National Aerospace University “Kharkiv Aviation Institute”
 Czech Republic: University of Defence in Brno, VR Group, VOP-026 Šternberk, RETIA, Czech Technical University in Prague, Institute of Chemical Technology - Prague, ICZ a.s.
 Slovakia Republic: Kerametal, s.r.o., Virtual Reality Media, a.s. (VRM), ZTS-ŠPECIÁL, a.s Dubnica nad Vahom, Institute of Informatics/Slovak Academy of Sciences, Slovak Technology University in Bratislava (STU), EVPÚ a.s. Electrotechnický Výskumný a Projectový Ústav Nová Dubnice, and Armed Forces Academy of General Milan Rastislav Štefánik, MAGIC Trading Corporation, a.s.
 Germany: Max Planck Society for the Advancement of Science, Rheinmetall Defence, DAAD, The Fraunhofer Institute for Reliability and Microintegration IZM, GE Measurement & Control Phonix X-ray.
 France: VirtualSim, University of Cergy-Pontoise-UCP, University of Paris-Est Marne-La-Valles-UPEM.
 Australia: University of New South Wales at Australian Defence Force Academy (UNSW Canberra), University of Sydney, La Trobe University, University of Wollongong, University of Melbourne, University of Adelaide
 New Zealand: Victoria University of Wellington.
 USA: Lockheed Martin Group, Neany Company, GCC Technologies Company, John Deere Company, NI/AWR Company, Synopsys Company
 Austria: SBA Research GmbH, St. Pölten University of Applied Sciences.
 Poland: WB ELECTRONICS S.A.

See also
 Military Technical Academies

References

External links

 Official website
 Lê Quý Đôn - Vietnamese scholar after whom the school is named
 Khoa công nghệ thông tin - đại học Kỹ thuật Lê Quý Đôn

Universities in Hanoi
Technical universities and colleges in Vietnam
Engineering universities and colleges in Vietnam
Military academies of Vietnam
Educational institutions established in 1966
1966 establishments in Vietnam